The Minister for Regional New South Wales is a minister in the Government of New South Wales who has responsibilities for regional areas. The current minister is Paul Toole who is also the Deputy Premier of New South Wales and the Minister for Police. The minister is responsible for administering the Regional NSW cluster.

In the second Perrottet ministry there are four additional ministers with specific regional responsibility:
 Minister for Regional Health, Bronnie Taylor
 Minister for Regional Transport and Roads, Sam Farraway
 Minister for Regional Youth, Ben Franklin
 Minister for Western New South Wales, Dugald Saunders.

Ultimately the minister is responsible to the Parliament of New South Wales.

List of ministers

Regional New South Wales
The following individuals have served as Minister for Regional New South Wales or any precedent titles:

Assistant ministerial titles

Regional tourism

See also 

List of New South Wales government agencies

References

Regional New South Wales